La vida es un sueño is the third soundtrack album of the Argentine telenovela Soy Luna, titled Soy Luna: La vida es un sueño (Life is a Dream) was scheduled to be released on March 3, 2017.

The album was published on the official Disney website by YouTube, and also by Vevo's music site.

On February 27, the Claro Música app made available 30 seconds of each song for users. Days later, the release date was announced, this only available in Mexico.

The Latin American countries were the only ones that received the edition with two discs. In Europe and other countries, the albums were released separately, the first with the title Soy Luna (season two) – La Vida es un Sueño 1, and the second with the title Soy Luna (season two) – La Vida es un Sueño 2.

Track listing

Charts

Weekly charts

Year-end charts

Certifications

References

Soy Luna albums
2017 soundtrack albums